Entre Rios (literally "Between Rivers" in Portuguese) or Entre Ríos (literally "Between Rivers" in Spanish) may refer to:

Places 
Argentina
 Entre Ríos Province,  a central province of Argentina.

Bolivia
 Entre Ríos, Tarija, a town in the Bolivian Tarija Department.
 Entre Ríos, Cochabamba, a small town in the Cochabamba Department of the South American Andean Republic of Bolivia

Brazil
 Entre Rios, Bahia, Brazilian municipality in the state of Bahia
 Entre Rios, Santa Catarina, Brazilian municipality in the state of Santa Catarina
 Entre Rios do Oeste, Brazilian municipality in the state of Paraná
 Entre Rios do Sul, Brazilian municipality in the state of Rio Grande do Sul
 Entre Rios de Minas, municipality in the state of Minas Gerais
 Desterro de Entre Rios, Brazilian municipality in the state of Minas Gerais

Other uses 
 Entre Ríos (band), an Argentine indietronica band
 Entre Ríos Railway (The Entre Ríos Railway (ER)), a former British-owned railway company
 Entre Ríos/Rodolfo Walsh (Buenos Aires Metro)